Elasmonematidae is an extinct family of gastropods in the clade Vetigastropoda (according to the taxonomy of the Gastropoda by Bouchet & Rocroi, 2005).

This family has no subfamilies.

Genera 
Genera within this family include:
 Elasmonema, the type genus, aka Callonema
 Anematina
 Discordichilus
 Hawletrochus
 Heidelbergeria
 Kimina
 Kyndalynia
 Streptotrochis

References 

 Paleobiology Database info